Peter Cottrell (born 22 May 1957) is an English cricketer. He played ten first-class matches for Cambridge University Cricket Club in 1979.

See also
 List of Cambridge University Cricket Club players

References

External links
 

1957 births
Living people
English cricketers
Cambridge University cricketers
British Universities cricketers